Atacalco Airport ,  is a rural airstrip  southeast of Recinto (es), a community in the Bío Bío Region of Chile.

The runway is aligned with the river, with a steep dropoff southwest to the riverbed. There is mountainous terrain northeast and southwest of the runway.

See also

Transport in Chile
List of airports in Chile

References

External links
OpenStreetMap - Atacalco
OurAirports - Atacalco
SkyVector - Atacalco Airport
FallingRain - Atacalco Airport

Airports in Ñuble Region